Hyophorbe indica, known commonly as palmier bâtard, palmiste poison,  or champagne palm, is a species of flowering plant in the family Arecaceae. It is endemic to the island of Réunion. It is threatened by habitat loss.

Description 
It resembles the related Hyophorbe amaricaulis and Hyophorbe vaughanii, but with an inflorescence that branches in four (rather than three) orders, and orange-red fruits. The palm comes in 2 colours: The green one grows in the east coast of the Réunion, while the red one is endemic to Tampon region.

Habitat 

References

External links 
 
 

indica
Endemic flora of Réunion
Palms of Réunion
Endangered plants
Taxonomy articles created by Polbot